or  is a historical district in Kobe, Hyōgo Prefecture, Japan, which contains a number of foreign residences from the late Meiji and early Taishō eras of Japanese history.  While the term  can refer to any foreign residence of this period in Japan, it usually refers to those of Kitano given the number and high concentration of those that remain.  Ijinkan districts exist in other locales (notably Hakodate and Nagasaki), but due to war and natural disasters, these districts are not as well preserved.

While some of the houses still serve as residences, many are open to tourists, making Kitano-chō one of the principal tourist attractions in Kobe.

See also
Groups of Traditional Buildings

References

External links
 City of Kobe: photo a la Carte - a collection of photos and stories of the Kitano Ijinkan area
 Ijinkan Net - Tourist site with maps and information on the Kitano Ijinkan area

Geography of Kobe
Buildings of the Meiji period
Tourist attractions in Kobe